The 1976 United States presidential election in Minnesota took place on November 2, 1976 as part of the 1976 United States presidential election. Voters chose ten electors, or representatives to the Electoral College, who voted for president and vice president.

Minnesota was won by the Democratic Party candidate, former Georgia Governor Jimmy Carter, won the state over incumbent President Gerald Ford by a landslide margin of 251,045 votes, or approximately 12.88%. Carter went on to win the election nationally, as the country's confidence in the Republican Party had been deeply shaken following the Watergate scandal and the subsequent resignation of Richard Nixon.

Prior to the election, Minnesota was considered as leaning-Carter. The Republican Party of Minnesota had been terribly weakened by the Watergate scandal. That weakened position was further eroded when Jimmy Carter chose Minnesota senator Walter Mondale as his vice-presidential running mate, securing the state for Carter. Mondale later went on to become the Democratic Party nominee for President in 1984, in which he only won one state, Minnesota.

The effect of Watergate on the political landscape in Minnesota can be clearly seen in the results of this election, as well as the landslide DFL victory in the 1974 gubernatorial election. Previously Minnesota had cast its electoral votes for the Republican nominee in twenty of the twenty-nine presidential elections from 1860 to 1972.

As of the 2020 presidential election, Minnesota has not cast a single electoral vote in favor of a Republican since 1972, making it the state with the longest Democratic streak up to the present day. , this is the last election in which Roseau County, Wilkin County, Douglas County, Wadena County, and Pipestone County voted for a Democratic presidential candidate.

Results

Results by county

See also
 United States presidential elections in Minnesota

References

1976
Min
1976 Minnesota elections